The Connecticut Avenue Line, designated Routes L1 and L2, is a daily bus route in Northwest Washington, D.C., United States. The L1 provides peak-direction rush hour service during weekdays, while the L2 operates seven days a week.

The current routing also incorporates Route L4, which operated with the L1 and L2 until 2012.

Route description
The L1 begins at the Potomac Park apartments at 18th and C Streets. It jogs to Constitution Avenue via 18th and 20th Streets, and turns right on 23rd Street. The route proceeds through Foggy Bottom and the campus of the George Washington University until Washington Circle, where it switches to New Hampshire Avenue for just a few blocks. The route turns north onto 20th Street to avoid Dupont Circle, and eventually reaches Connecticut Avenue by way of Massachusetts Avenue and Florida Avenue. The L2 starts at Farragut Square, one block north of the southern terminus of Connecticut Avenue, then proceeds north along the avenue. It passes underneath Dupont Circle via the Connecticut Avenue underpass, and is joined by the L1 at an intersection with Florida Avenue and S Street.

Now together, the two routes continue north along the avenue. The L1 crosses Rock Creek Park via the Taft Bridge, while the L2 takes a brief detour into Adams Morgan via Columbia Road, Calvert Street, and the Duke Ellington Bridge. Following Connecticut Avenue northbound, the routes serve multiple stations of the Red Line, namely the Woodley Park, Cleveland Park, and Van Ness, until the Red Line diverts from Connecticut Avenue. The routes also pass through the Woodley Park and Cleveland Park neighborhoods, of which the former also includes the National Zoological Park. In the Forest Hills neighborhood, the routes also provide access to the Van Ness Campus of the University of the District of Columbia, the district's only public university.

Both routes terminate at Chevy Chase Circle, just south of Western Avenue and the Maryland state line. Here, the two routes provide transfers to the L8, also known as the Connecticut Avenue–Maryland Line. Essentially the L1 and L2's continuation into Maryland, the L8 begins at the nearby Friendship Heights station and serves Connecticut Avenue in Chevy Chase, Kensington, and Aspen Hill.

L1 stops

L2 stops

History
At different points, the Connecticut Avenue Line was al  operated by the L1, L2, L3, L4, L5, L7, L8, and L9. Eventually, the lines were converted into the Connecticut Avenue Line as the L1, L2, and L4, and then the Connecticut Avenue–Maryland Line as the L7 and L8.

Until June 17, 2012, the Connecticut Avenue Line was also served by the L4. The route operated from Dupont Circle to Chevy Chase Circle via Connecticut Avenue, of which the whole route overlapped with the L1 and L2.

On June 17, 2012, the line was restructured where the L1 would operate along Virginia Avenue NW, between 23rd and C streets NW. Route L2 would operate directly along Connecticut Avenue between Chevy Chase Circle and Farragut Square, while using the underpass at Dupont Circle, except for a diversion via Calvert Street and Columbia Road. Route L4 would be discontinued and replaced by routes L1 and L2 as the route was a duplicate to both the routes.

On December 18, 2016, route L2 late night trips on Fridays and Saturdays were extended to both Friendship Heights station and Bethesda station due to earlier closure of Metrorail.

In 2018, WMATA released a study on the L1 and L2. Proposals sets goes as follows:

Convert all route L1 trips to route L2 in order to simplify service options and increase weekday frequency between Chevy Chase Circle and Farragut Square
During weekends, terminate every other Route L2 trip at Woodley Park. Between Chevy Chase Circle to Woodley Park, buses would run every 20 minutes instead of every 30 minutes, BUT between Woodley Park and Farragut Square, buses would run every 60 minutes instead of every 30 minutes.
Have route L1 operate daily service terminate at 21st Street and Virginia Avenue NW instead of continuing south on 23rd Street and east on Constitution Avenue NW and northbound L1 trips be rerouted to operate along to go around Dupont Circle and north on Connecticut Ave NW instead of its current route via Massachusetts and Florida Avenues NW.

However none of the proposals went through.

During the COVID-19 pandemic, route L1 was suspended beginning on March 16, 2020 and route L2 operated on its Saturday supplemental schedule. However on March 18, 2020, further changes happened with route L2 operating on its Sunday schedule and weekend service being suspended beginning on March 21, 2020. A modified schedule and all weekend service resumed on August 23, 2020 but Route L1 remained suspended and late night service to Bethesda station remained suspended.

On September 26, 2020, WMATA proposed to eliminate all route L1 service due to low federal funding. Route L1 has not operated since March 13, 2020 due to Metro's response to the COVID-19 pandemic.

In February 2021, WMATA proposed to eliminate the L2 and replace it with a modified H2 and H4 which would run along Connecticut Avenue north of Calvert Street NW and Routes 42 and 43 south of  Columbia Road NW to replace the L2 if WMATA does not get any federal funding.

On September 5, 2021, Route L2 service was increased to operate every 20 minutes daily between 7:00 AM to 9:00 PM.

Notes

References

External links
 Metrobus

L1